Balsall Heath West is an electoral ward of Birmingham City Council in the south of Birmingham, West Midlands, covering an urban area to the south of the city centre.

The ward was created in 2018 as a result of boundary changes that saw the number of wards in Birmingham increase from 40 to 69.

Boundaries 

The ward was largely created from the former Sparkbrook ward and is almost entirely within the Birmingham Hall Green constituency with the exception of a small area of housing between Bristol Road and Pershore Road which lies within Birmingham Edgbaston.

Profile

The ward contains areas included in post-war slum clearance regeneration as well late Victoria/Edwardian terraces. Whilst the ward does not include Edgbaston Cricket Ground it does include the areas immediately to its north and east.

Councillors

Elections since 2018

Balsall Heath West

Notes

References 

Wards of Birmingham, West Midlands
2018 establishments in England